The 2004 Champion Hurdle was a horse race held at Cheltenham Racecourse on Tuesday 16 March 2004. It was the 74th running of the Champion Hurdle.

The race was won by Laurence Byrne's Hardy Eustace, a seven-year-old gelding trained in Ireland by Dessie Hughes and ridden by Conor O'Dwyer. His victory was the first in the race for his owner, trainer and jockey.

Hardy Eustace started a 33/1 outsider and led throughout to win by five lengths from Rooster Booster who had won the race in the previous year, with Intersky Falcon in third. Thirteen of the fourteen runners completed the course.

Race details
 Sponsor: Smurfit
 Purse: £300,000; First prize: £174,000
 Going: Good
 Distance: 2 miles 110 yards
 Number of runners: 14
 Winner's time: 3m 54.50

Full result

 Abbreviations: nse = nose; nk = neck; hd = head; dist = distance; UR = unseated rider; PU = pulled up

Winner's details
Further details of the winner, Hardy Eustace
 Sex: Gelding
 Foaled: 5 April 1997
 Country: Ireland
 Sire: Archway; Dam: Sterna Star (Corvaro)
 Owner: Laurence Byrne
 Breeder: Patrick Joyce

References

Champion Hurdle
 2004
Champion Hurdle
Champion Hurdle
2000s in Gloucestershire